This is a list of adult fiction books that topped The New York Times Fiction Best Seller list in 1935. When the list began in 1931 through 1941 it only reflected sales in the New York City area.

The two most popular books that year were Europa, by Robert Briffault, which held on top of the list for 9 weeks, and Of Time and the River by Thomas Wolfe, which was on top of the list for 7 weeks.

See also

 1935 in literature
 Lists of The New York Times Fiction Best Sellers
 Publishers Weekly list of bestselling novels in the United States in the 1930s

References

1935
.
1935 in the United States